The USA Cycling National Racing Calendar (NRC) is an annual competition of road bicycle racing events held in the United States and sponsored by USA Cycling.  The NRC includes a men's and women's individual and team rankings based on points awarded at the events.  The competition is open to amateur and professional riders regardless of national origin.

Events

In 2011, the NRC had 30 events: 8 stage races, 15 crits, 2 one-day road races, and 5 omniums.

In 2012, the NRC has 29 events, and a total prize purse of more than one million dollars.

Past winners

Men's individual 
 2010: Luis Amaran, 
 2009: Tom Zirbel, 
 2008: Rory Sutherland, 
 2007: Rory Sutherland, 
 2006: Floyd Landis, 
 2005: Scott Moninger, 
 2004: Chris Horner, 
 2003: Chris Horner, 
 2002: Chris Horner, 
 2001: Trent Klasna,

Women's individual
 2010: Catherine Cheatley, 
 2009: Alison Powers, 
 2008: Tina Pic,  Colavita/Sutter Home
 2007: Laura Van Gilder, Cheerwine
 2006: Tina Pic, Colavita/Cooking Light Women's
 2005: Tina Pic,
 2004: Tina Pic, Genesis Scuba/FFCC
 2003: Lyne Bessette, Saturn Cycling Team
 2002: Laura Van Gilder, Trek PLUS
 2001: Lyne Bessette, 
 2000: Tina Pic,

Men's team
 2010: Fly V Australia
 2009: Colavita
 2008: Health Net Pro Cycling Team Presented by Maxxis
 2007: Health Net Pro Cycling Team Presented by Maxxis
 2006: Health Net Pro Cycling Team Presented by Maxxis
 2005: Health Net Pro Cycling Team Presented by Maxxis
 2004: Health Net Pro Cycling Team Presented by Maxxis
 2003: Saturn Cycling Team
 2002: Mercury Cycling Team
 2001: Mercury Cycling Team

Women's team
 2010: Colavita-Baci
 2009: Team Tibco
 2008: Cheerwine
 2007: WebcorBuilders
 2006: Team Lipton
 2005: T-Mobile Women
 2004: Genesis Scuba/FFCC
 2003: Saturn Cycling Team
 2002: Saturn Cycling Team

References 

Cycle races in the United States